The Royal Numismatic Society (RNS) is a learned society and charity based in London, United Kingdom which promotes research into all branches of numismatics. Its patron  was Queen Elizabeth II.

Membership
Foremost collectors and researchers, both professional and amateur, in the field of numismatics are amongst the fellows of the Society. They must be elected to the Society by the Council. The Numismatic Chronicle is the annual publication of the Royal Numismatic Society.

History
The society was founded in 1836 as the Numismatic Society of London and received the title "Royal Numismatic Society" from Edward VII by Royal Charter in 1904. The history of the Society was presented as a series of annual Presidential addresses by R.A. Carson – these were published in the Numismatic Chronicle between 1975 and 1978. The fifth and latest instalment was written to mark the 150th anniversary of the Society in 1986, and the full text was published in 1986 as A History of the Royal Numismatic Society, 1936-1986 (London, 1986).

Publications
The society has an annual journal, The Numismatic Chronicle, and publishes a book series known as the Special Publications.

Awards of The Royal Numismatic Society 
 Honorary Fellowship
 The Medal of the Royal Numismatic Society
 The Parkes Weber Prize  
 The Lhotka Prize
 The Samir Shamma Prize for Islamic Numismatics
 The Gilljam Prize for Third-Century Numismatics

See also

List of presidents of the Royal Numismatic Society
List of special publications of the Royal Numismatic Society

References

External links
 Official website
 The Numismatic Chronicle on jstor
Snible.org